was a district located in Yamanashi Prefecture, Japan.

As of 2004, the district had an estimated population of 10,701. The total area was 79.27 km2.

Until the day before the district dissolved (October 31, 2005), the district has only two municipalities left.
 Katsunuma
 Yamato

Mergers
On October 12, 2004 - the town of Kasugai was merged with the towns of Ichinomiya, Isawa, Misaka and Yatsushiro, the village of Sakaigawa (all from Higashiyatsushiro District), to create the city of Fuefuki.
On March 22, 2005 - the town of Makioka, and the village of Mitomi were merged into the expanded city of Yamanashi.
On November 1, 2005 - the towns of Katsunuma and Yamato were merged with the city of Enzan to create the city of Kōshū. Higashiyamanashi District was dissolved as a result of this merger.

Former districts of Yamanashi Prefecture